Endless Blue Sky is the eighth studio album from American new-age pianist Kevin Kern. As with his preceding albums, it is an album of instrumental songs. It was released on January 27, 2009.

It is his first album to include the concept of bonus tracks, the Asian version having one, a cover of Jay Chou's "A Thousand Miles Away" (千里之外). It is also his first studio album to exceed eleven tracks, and the first studio album to exceed an hour in length (for the Asian edition) - previously, only his compilation albums were over an hour long.

Track listing
All tracks composed and arranged by Kevin Kern except #11, written by Jay Chou.

"Joy of the Journey" – 3:18
"Velvet Green" – 3:52
"Endless Blue Sky" – 6:29
"Sunset Prayer" – 2:52
"Light Spirit" – 4:23
"Scene in a Dream" – 4:54
"The Skipping Song" – 4:44
"Caring Friend" – 5:00
"Wending Our Way Home" – 4:31
"The Glistening Pond" – 5:16
"A Thousand Miles Away" – 4:50 (Asian bonus track)
"Gifts Along the Way" – 3:54
"Joy of the Journey" (Reprise) – 1:58
"Always Near" – 5:19

Personnel
 Kevin Kern – piano, keyboards, producer
 Dean Magraw - acoustic guitar
 Jill Olson - violin
 Rebecca Arons - cello
 Gordon Johnson - acoustic and electric bass
 Richard Laeton - art director

References

External links
Kevin Kern's official website
Kevin Kern at Real Music
The album at Real Music
The Asian version of album at Real Music

Kevin Kern albums
2009 albums